First Light is the fourth studio album (fifth overall) by Jamaican-American collective Easy Star All-Stars. Unlike their other albums, this is the first album that features original songs by the band.

Track listing 
 Don’t Stop The Music
 Break Of Dawn
 First Light (Ramblin’ Fever)
 One Likkle Draw (Feat. Junior Jazz and Daddy Lion Chandell) (Daddy Lion Chandell from Subatomic Sound System)
 Something Went Wrong
 Easy Now Star (Feat. The Meditations, Tony Tuff, and Lady Ann)
 Universal Law
 Paid My Dues
 Reggae Pension
 In The Light
 Unbelievable (Feat. Cas Haley)
 All The Way
 I Won’t Stop
 Don’t Stop Dub Music

[Bonus Tracks]
 15. First Light (Dubmatix Remix)
 16. Demons

References

2011 albums
Easy Star All-Stars albums
Dubstep albums
Easy Star Records albums
Albums produced by Michael Goldwasser